Erik Per Sullivan (born July 12, 1991) is an American former actor. He is best known for his role as Dewey, the younger brother to middle child Malcolm (Frankie Muniz) on the Fox series Malcolm in the Middle.

Early life
Sullivan was born on July 12, 1991, in Worcester, Massachusetts, the only child of his mother, Ann, born in Sweden and naturalized as a US citizen in 2007, and Fred Sullivan, of Irish descent, who owns a Mexican eatery called The Alamo. He speaks a little Swedish, and his family visits Sweden almost every year. At a young age, he began studying piano and the saxophone. He has a first-degree black belt in taekwondo.

Sullivan studied at the Mount Saint Charles Academy, in Rhode Island, and Phillips Exeter Academy in New Hampshire. Beginning in 2009, he attended the University of Southern California in Los Angeles.

Career
From January 9, 2000, to May 14, 2006, Sullivan played Malcolm's younger brother Dewey in the Fox sitcom Malcolm in the Middle. In 2005, along with Malcolm co-star Jane Kaczmarek, he wrote the afterword to the children's book Together, which is about farming and was inspired by the nonprofit organization Heifer International.

Sullivan had a starring role in the 2004 movie Christmas with the Kranks and has played a variety of characters in film and on television, including the title role in the independent film Mo (2007), as well as voicing Sheldon the Seahorse in both the animated film Finding Nemo and its video game tie-in.

Sullivan's last acting credit was an appearance in the 2010 film Twelve when he was 18 years old. He has since kept a low profile, being notably absent from several Malcolm in the Middle cast reunions.

Filmography

Awards and nominations

References

External links

1991 births
Living people
20th-century American male actors
21st-century American male actors
American male child actors
American male film actors
American male taekwondo practitioners
American male television actors
American male voice actors
American people of Irish descent
American people of Swedish descent
Male actors from Worcester, Massachusetts
People from Milford, Massachusetts
Phillips Exeter Academy alumni
University of Southern California alumni